Oklahoma State Question 820 was a voter initiative to legalize adult purchasing, possession and consumption of cannabis in the U.S. state of Oklahoma. It would have placed Oklahoma Medical Marijuana Authority in charge of business regulation. It appeared on the March 7, 2023 general ballot.

Question 820 was rejected by over 60% of voters.

History

Background
In Oklahoma, ballot initiatives are drafted by their proponents and then submitted to the Oklahoma Secretary of State who then must notify the Governor, the Oklahoma Election Board, and publish a notice so that any citizen of the state may file a protest as to the constitutionality of the ballot initiative. Citizens have 10 days to file a protest with the Oklahoma Supreme Court. After all legal challenges are heard, the petition process begins. The number of signatures required for the petition to be successful depends on the type of ballot initiative, but all measures are based on the total number of votes cast in the last general election for Governor. Referendums and Initiatives require the least number of signatures at 5% and 8% respectively. Initiatives for Constitutional Changes require 15%. Rejected Initiative or Referendum Measures require 25%. Once collected, the signed petitions are submitted to the Secretary of State for counting. Once counted, the proposed ballot title is sent to the Attorney General of Oklahoma for legal review. After this review, the Secretary of State submits the signed petition to the Oklahoma Supreme Court. After a short period where objections can be filed, the Secretary of State sends the petition to the Governor and the State Election Board. The Governor of Oklahoma chooses the date of the vote on the ballot initiative.

Initiative
The initiative was filed with Oklahoma Secretary of State on January 3, 2022 by Oklahomans for Sensible Marijuana Laws. On July 5, over 164,000 signatures were submitted to secretary of state for November 2022 ballot access. On August 22, 2022, the initiative was confirmed to have over 117,000 validated signatures of the  95,000 needed to qualify for the ballot.

A petition was filed with the Oklahoma Supreme Court in August, after certification, to ensure the measure appears on the November 2022 ballot despite various administrative deadlines that may have expired while the initiative petition signatures were being counted. Petitioners held that the administrative requirement was arbitrary, and not based on any statute or formally adopted administrative rule.
On August 30, the court ordered that it would adjudicate whether or not the 2022 ballot would include SQ 820, despite the Oklahoma Election Board's position that August 29 was that statutory deadline. On September 21, with two challenges concerning the ballot title still before the supreme court, it issued its decision not to compel the elections board to include the question on the November 2022 ballot.

On October 18, 2022, the governor slated a special election to occur on March 7, 2023, which would include the initiative.

Proposal
Oklahoma State Question 820 would change Oklahoma statutes to legalize recreational cannabis in the state for anyone over 21 years of age. Statute based state questions can be altered after their passing through normal legislation passed by the Oklahoma Legislature and signed by the Governor of Oklahoma. The law would set the recreational cannabis tax rate at 15% and allow for some marijuana drug offenders to have their convictions reversed and records expunged.

Initiative text

Campaign
Campaigning around the state question had remained relatively low after its announcement until February 2023. On February 2, 2023, the "Yes" campaign announced it had raised $350,000; the same day, the "No" campaign announced it would be headed by former governor of Oklahoma Frank Keating. Oklahoma Watch reported that State Question 820 would likely be decided by voter turnout. State Question 788, Oklahoma's successful medical marijuana legalization state question, occurred during midterm election primaries and saw higher turnout than the gubernatorial election. However, the last state question election to be held on a non-general or primary election, held in September 2005, failed with only 18% turnout.

Endorsements

See also
2018 Oklahoma State Question 788
Cannabis in Oklahoma
List of 2023 United States cannabis reform proposals

Further reading

References

External links

Question 820 official text at Oklahoma Secretary of State
Oklahoma State Question 820, Marijuana Legalization Initiative (2022) at Ballotpedia

2023 cannabis law reform
2023 Oklahoma elections
Oklahoma ballot measures
Proposed laws of the United States